The Journal of International Financial Management & Accounting is a triannual peer-reviewed academic journal published by John Wiley & Sons. It covers the international aspects of financial management, banking,  financial services, auditing, and taxation. The editors-in-chief are Sidney Gray (University of Sydney) and Richard Levich (New York University).

It has been an official journal of the International Association for Accounting Education and Research since 1999.

Abstracting and indexing 
The journal is abstracted and indexed in the Social Sciences Citation Index, ProQuest, Current Contents/Social & Behavioral Sciences, and EBSCO databases. According to the Journal Citation Reports, the journal has a 2018 impact factor of 1.478, ranking it 51 out of 103 journals in the category "Business Finance".

References

External links 
 
 International Association for Accounting Research and Education

Wiley-Blackwell academic journals
English-language journals
Publications established in 1989
Triannual journals
Finance journals
Accounting journals